Corso Venezia is a street in Milan, Italy. It is one of the city's most exclusive and elegant avenues, being part of the city's upscale Quadrilatero della moda shopping district, along with Via Montenapoleone, Via della Spiga, Via Sant'Andrea and Via Manzoni. It also boasts a great collection of Renaissance, Baroque, Rococo and Neo-classical palaces, parks and gardens.

Shops
Armani
Braccialini
Brooksfield
Burberry
C.P. Company
Dolce & Gabbana Man
Dolce & Gabbana
Diesel
Diesel Kids
Dodo-Pomellato
Liu Jo
M Missoni
Marlboro Classic
Miu Miu
Nero Giardini
Nomination
Paola Frani
Paolo Tonali
Pavillon Christofle
Pinko
Prada
Stone Island
Vivienne Westwood
Wolford

Palaces, Gardens and Parks
The street contains several important (notably Baroque and Neoclassical, but also Medieval and Renaissance), such as the Palazzo Serbelloni and the Villa Reale, found in the landscaped Giardini Pubblici of the street. In the Giardini Pubblici there is also the Museo Civico di Storia Naturale di Milano, which was founded in 1838 when Giuseppe de Cristoforis (1803–1837) donated his collections to the city. Its first director was Giorgio Jan (1791–1866).

Gallery

See also

References

Streets in Milan